Politics.ie is an Irish internet discussion forum. It was founded by David Cochrane. The site was owned by Pie Media Ltd. David Cochrane resigned as director in August 2012. Pie Media Limited dissolved with the company closing on Wednesday the 22nd of April 2015.

Most contributors are anonymous.

Legal action
Michael Daly took legal action against David Cochrane in a case involving libel.

Technical issues
The site went offline for a period in July/August 2018.

Intermittent technical problems continued throughout Q4 2018 and into 2019.
In mid February 2019 A serious anomaly occurred resulting in the websites link to the forum software breaking so the server returned the file listing of the web root directory. This resulted in the hosting provider suspending the Account.

References

External links
 

Irish political websites
Political Internet forums